Roger Priddy is the creator of Priddy Books, which publishes books for babies and young children. Priddy Books is a division of Macmillan Publishers and books published by the imprint have won several Practical Pre-School Awards.

References

External links

Year of birth missing (living people)
Living people
20th-century publishers (people)
21st-century publishers (people)